HD 130917 is a single star in the northern constellation of Boötes. It is an A-type main sequence star with a stellar classification of A4V. At an apparent magnitude of 5.80, it is visible to the naked eye.

References

External links
 HR 5532
 CCDM J14500+2837
 Image HD 130917

Boötes
130917
072552
A-type main-sequence stars
5532
Durchmusterung objects